EarthCheck (previously known as EC3 Global), an international tourism advisory group. It is headquartered in Brisbane, Queensland and was developed by the Sustainable Tourism CRC, a research centre specialising in sustainable tourism and research. 

In June 2010, the Sustainable Tourism CRC (STCRC), completed its formal research agreement with the Australian Commonwealth Government. As one of Australia's most successful research centres, it evolved into three International legacy projects. These include Sustainable Tourism Online, the not-for-profit EarthCheck Research Institute (ERI) and the APEC International Centre for Sustainable Tourism. All of these centres for excellence are supported by EarthCheck.

References 

Environment of Australia
Sustainable tourism